The Chinese People's Liberation Army Forces Hong Kong Building is the headquarters building of the People's Liberation Army Hong Kong Garrison, located on Lung Wui Road, Admiralty, Hong Kong.

It is a 113-metre (371 ft) tall, 28-floor building located within the former HMS Tamar naval base. The building is also known by its former name the Prince of Wales Building.

History
Constructed in 1979, the building was named the Prince of Wales Building. It housed the head office of the Royal Navy stationed in Hong Kong until the territory's handover to the People's Republic of China on 1 July 1997 when it was made the head office of the PLA Hong Kong Garrison. In May 2000, the Legislative Council of Hong Kong passed the Military Installations Closed Areas (Amendment) Order 2000, which renamed the former Prince of Wales Barracks to Central Barracks, and the Prince of Wales Building to the Chinese People's Liberation Army Forces Hong Kong Building. After the base became the Central Barracks, the old name of the building remained visible in large raised letters along the bottom of the tower for several years. The building underwent a 20-month full renovation, completed in 2014, during which most of the troops were transferred to the Stonecutters Island base.

Due to its distinctive shape, likened to a wineglass, the building stands out from the rest of the Admiralty waterfront buildings. Architects attribute the shape of the building to passive protection, its narrow stem with the protruding upper storeys, supposedly makes it difficult to climb or attack. It is also informally known as 'the upside-down Gin bottle' due to its shape resembling a bottle of Gordon's Gin. The corner of the building at the podium level which faces east (towards Admiralty MTR station) used to be a chapel under British use of the barracks. There used to be a crucifix visible on the exterior—however, during external refurbishment (including replacing the 'Prince of Wales Building' inscription in English with its current name in Chinese), the cross was removed.

People's Liberation Army in Hong Kong 

The PLA maintains a number of garrisons in the Hong Kong Special Administrative Region. In addition to the PLA Forces Hong Kong Building, there are notable garrisons at the Stonecutters Island, and at Stanley Fort. Soldiers located at these three garrisons are considered to be the élite of the PLA. The soldiers are not permitted to leave their compounds, even during off-duty times to mingle with the local populace. As a restricted area, the PLA Forces Hong Kong Building is heavily guarded by soldiers with automatic rifles.

Gallery

See also

 People's Liberation Army Hong Kong Garrison
 List of buildings and structures in Hong Kong
 Stanley Fort
 British Forces Overseas Hong Kong
 Military of Hong Kong under British rule (Category)

References

External links

 Pongü's Travel guide article on Chinese People's Liberation Army Forces Hong Kong Building

Skyscraper office buildings in Hong Kong
Central, Hong Kong
Military of Hong Kong
Buildings and structures completed in 1979